Venus fra Vestø (literally, Venus from West Island) is a 1962 Danish comedy war film directed by Annelise Reenberg and starring Malene Schwartz. The film is based on Jerrard Tickell's 1951 novel Appointment with Venus (Danish title: Operation Venus), but re-set on a Danish island rather than a fictional island in the Channel Islands.

Cast
Malene Schwartz as Miss Nicola Egede-Schack
Henning Moritzen as John Morland
Dirch Passer as Ditlev Egede-Schack
William Knoblauch as Parish Council Chairman Ole Klausen
Ole Wegener as Radio Telegraphist Henriksen
Jan Priiskorn-Schmidt as Søren Severinsen
Arthur Jensen as Pive Ras
Holger Hansen as Morten Jacobsen
Gunnar Lemvigh as Kromand
Jakob Nielsen as Kristoffer
Jerrard Tickell as Uncle George
Poul Thomsen as Courtroom Interpreter
Karl Heinz Neumann as Captain Weiss
Inger Knoblauch
Edith Hermansen
Avi Sagild as Mathilde
Varinka Wichfeld Muus
Flemming B. Muus
Vera Lynn as Herself
Richard Wattis, Edward Chapman, Allan Blanner and David Collet as Englishmen

Notes

See also
Appointment with Venus (1951)

References

External links

1962 films
1962 drama films
Danish war comedy films
1960s Danish-language films
ASA Filmudlejning films
Remakes of British films
Films directed by Annelise Reenberg
Films scored by Sven Gyldmark
Films about cattle
Films set on islands
Films based on British novels
Films set in 1940
Danish World War II films